is a public university at Hiroshima, Hiroshima, Japan, founded in 1994, educating both undergraduates and graduate students. HCU is especially distinctive for its Peace Studies program, in line with Hiroshima's status as an international city of peace.

Faculties and Graduate Schools

 Faculty / Graduate School of Information Sciences
 Department of Computer and Network Engineering
 Department of Intelligent Systems
 Department of Systems Engineering
 Department of Biomedical Information Sciences

 Faculty / Graduate School of International Studies
 Department of International Studies

 Faculty / Graduate School of Arts
 Department of Fine Arts
 Department of Painting
 Department of Sculpture
 Department of Design and Applied Arts

 Graduate School of Peace Studies

Hiroshima Peace Institute

The Hiroshima Peace Institute (HPI) was established on April 1, 1998, as a research institute affiliated with HCU, located in the city that experienced the first atomic bombing in human history.

References

External links
 Official website

Educational institutions established in 1994
Public universities in Japan
Universities and colleges in Hiroshima Prefecture
1994 establishments in Japan